Lady Alice Knyvet was an English noblewoman, and the wife of John Knyvet of Buckenham Castle.

In 1461, left in charge of the castle by her husband, she refused to surrender it to Edward IV and the royal commissioners. Raising the drawbridge, she defended the castle "with slings, 'paveises', faggots, timbers, and other armaments of war", assisted by fifty people "armed with swords, 'glavyes', bows and arrows".

References

People of the Wars of the Roses
Alice
15th-century English people
15th-century English women
Women in medieval European warfare
Women in 15th-century warfare